Franz Gattermann (born 25 May 1955) is an Austrian cross-country skier. He competed at the 1976 Winter Olympics and the 1984 Winter Olympics.

References

1955 births
Living people
Austrian male cross-country skiers
Olympic cross-country skiers of Austria
Cross-country skiers at the 1976 Winter Olympics
Cross-country skiers at the 1984 Winter Olympics
People from Ried im Innkreis District
Sportspeople from Upper Austria